Garm Khaneh (also Romanized as Garm Khāneh and Garmkhāneh; also known as Karmakhan and Qarmakhan) is a village in Khanandabil-e Gharbi Rural District, in the Central District of Khalkhal County, Ardabil Province, Iran. At the 2006 census, its population was 167, in 43 families.

References 

Towns and villages in Khalkhal County